A witch post is a local superstition where the cross of Saint Andrew (a saltire) is used as a hex sign on the fireplaces in Northern England, Yorkshire, and Lancashire, in order to prevent witches from flying down the chimney and entering the house to do mischief. By placing the St Andrew's cross on one of the fireplace posts or lintels, witches are thought to be prevented from entering through this opening. In this case, it is similar to the use of a witch ball, although the cross is supposed to actively prevent witches from entering, and the witch ball is supposed to passively delay or entice the witch, and perhaps entrap it.

Observations
One of the more curious features of the central North York Moors of England was the use of so-called witch posts in cottages. Witch post is the fairly modern name for a tall piece of oak wood which, in the seventeenth century, supported the smoke-hood of the inglenook fireplace. It stood on the floor and was incorporated within the structure, being distinguished by carvings on the face near the top. The carvings varied but most included a cross which was shaped like an X. Sometimes there were scroll-like effects beneath the X; on occasions hearts and other designs were incorporated, perhaps with a date. With only one exception, these posts were located in cottages in and around the North York Moors. The exception is one discovered in a house at Rawtenstall in Lancashire. In all cases, they formed part of the structure of the building and the carving was of the style popular in the seventeenth century. Indeed one post in a Glaisdale house bears the date 1664. It is not certain how widespread was the carving of these posts, but surviving examples have been found at Midgley, Glaisdale, Danby, Rosedale, Gillamoor, Farndale, Egton, Goathland, Lealholm and Silpho near Scarborough, a rather compact, if somewhat wild area of the moors. Some have been removed while others remain in situ.

There have only ever been two witches posts found outside the North York Moors, one from Rawtenstall in Lancashire, and one at Great House, Midgley. They were always made of oak and built into the structure of the house as a support for the smokehood above the inglenook fireplace. The posts were carved at the top with varying degrees of complexity, but all the designs included at least one X shaped cross. Often there were one or more rolls fashioned beneath it. A witch post from Postgate Farm, Glaisdale has the date 1664 carved into it, together with the letters EPIB.

"The witch, in order to gain power over a dwelling house, must go through the house and past the hearth. The door and chimney were the only means of access, but she could not pass the witch post with its cross. Hence it was a defence at the hearth ... a crooked sixpence was kept in a hole at the centre of the post. When the butter would not turn you took a knitting needle, which was kept for the purpose in a groove at the top, and with it got out the sixpence and put it in the churn."

"The name witch post did not appear until the 19th century – Canon John Christopher Atkinson’s book Forty Years in a Moorland Parish (revised in 1908) gives space to witchcraft beliefs and old houses, but does not mention witch posts. However, in 1893 he donated an X-marked post to Pitt Rivers Museum in Oxford. With a dozen scrolls, it was from the Old Shoemaker’s Shop at Danby-in-Cleveland and his letter, dated March 5, 1892, describes it as ‘the (assumed) witch post’. I have seen his letter and it is clear he did not think the posts were associated with witchcraft – but he does not offer an alternative suggestion. Joseph Ford's Some Reminiscences and Folk Lore of Danby Parish and District (1953) tells us that such posts came to be called witch posts, suggesting this was not their original name. Other authors believe the term came into use during the 20th century.

"Witch post, Stang End Cottage, Ryedale Folk Museum. Witch posts are a rare architectural feature found in the medieval houses of North Yorkshire. They essentially consist of carving on one of the posts supporting the inglenook of the cottage, always including a St. Andrew's Cross, although this example makes me think more of the Roman-period chi-rho monogram."

"Witch Posts. It is thought that they were intended to protect the house or hearth from the influence of witches or prevent them from entering the house. Less than 20 of these carved posts are known, all in north-east Yorkshire, except for one found in Lancashire... The Huntleys fitted new improvement, a chimney and smokehood. The post supporting the smokehood is carved with a St Andrew's cross and several raised bands. This is the witch post."

"As a relatively isolated hilltop village, superstition seems to have endured well into the Twentieth Century in Barkisland. A short distance from the Griffin Inn on Stainland Road stands Stocks House, so called because it was formerly the village lockup and an old set of stocks still survives beside it as a memorial to its former role. At some point it was converted into a private residence and it was probably during this process that a “witch-post” was added to the hearth to deflect the influence of baleful magic known as maleficium. Chimneys and fireplaces were regarded as a vulnerable location by which witches could gain access to a house and so to the superstitious mind, demanded such apotropaic contingencies. Jacqueline Simpson and Steve Roud explain, “In Yorkshire farmhouses of the Seventeenth and Eighteenth Centuries, hearths were screened by partitions ending in posts of rowan wood carved with cross-shaped patterns, called ‘witch posts’... Belief in their protective power continued into the 1920s, when Yorkshire builders made new ones when old houses were being rebuilt”."

References

Bibliography
 Atkinson, J. C. 1891. Forty years in a moorland parish; reminiscences and researches in Danby in Cleveland. London: Macmillan and Co.
 Ford, Joseph. 1953. Some reminiscences and folk lore of Danby Parish and district. Whitby: Horne & Son.
 Williams, Mary. 1987. Witches in old North Yorkshire. Beverley: Hutton. ; 9780907033547.
 Simpson, Jacqueline, and Stephen Roud. 2000. A dictionary of English folklore. Oxford: Oxford University Press. ; 9780192100191.

External links
 http://www.nicholasrhea.co.uk/author/archives/00000039.html
 http://www.darlingtonandstocktontimes.co.uk/leisure/countrymansdiary/8949308.Blessed_houses_marked_with_an_X/
 https://www.flickr.com/photos/forest_pines/5906134110/
 http://www.fromtheotherside.org.uk/guides/past-events/great-house-midgley/

Christian symbols
Cross symbols
English folklore
Northern England
Superstitions of Great Britain
Witchcraft in England
Fireplaces